Christopher Tyler Young is an American actor, producer and director, best known for portraying child prodigy computer hacker Bryce Lynch in the Max Headroom series (1987–1988), and Buckley "Buck" Ripley in She's Having a Baby and The Great Outdoors (both 1988), and voicing Rob in The Brave Little Toaster Goes to Mars (1988) and The Brave Little Toaster to the Rescue (1989).

Life and career
Young was born in Chambersburg, Pennsylvania, the son of Judy (née Kreutz), a teacher and librarian, and Dick Young, a businessman. Young's show business career started at the age of 15 when he played Bryce Lynch, a child computer hacker prodigy, in the Max Headroom science fiction television series. He starred in many other television shows and several feature-length films thereafter including PCU, Book of Love and The Great Outdoors.

Further to his acting, Young co-produced and starred in the NBC movie Killing Mr. Griffin in 1997, produced The Proud Family Movie in 2005 for the Disney Channel and supervised post-production for the romantic comedy Marigold. Young has also been affiliated with the music industry, having produced twelve music videos for American Idol winner Kelly Clarkson's 2006 tour, producing and directing thirteen music videos for American girl group Slumber Party Girls and directing the music video "Struggle" for indie pop band Ringside.

Filmography

References

External links
 
 

Male actors from Pennsylvania
American male child actors
American male film actors
American music video directors
American male television actors
American television directors
Television producers from Pennsylvania
American male voice actors
Living people
People from Chambersburg, Pennsylvania
Film directors from Pennsylvania
20th-century American male actors
Year of birth missing (living people)